The Ukrainian Military Law-Enforcement Service (VSP) is the military police of the Ukrainian Armed Forces. It was formed on May 19, 2002.

History

International missions

Iraq (2003–2005)
Members of the VSP were assigned to each of the four Ukrainian contingents, while they were stationed in the province of Wasit, Iraq.

See also
 Armed Forces of Ukraine#Military Police

References

Military of Ukraine
Military provosts
Ukraine
Military units and formations established in 2002